The 2022 SGI Canada Best of the West was held from April 22 to 24 at the Nutana Curling Club in Saskatoon, Saskatchewan. The newly created event consisted of teams with all players thirty years and younger. It was played between the four provinces of Western Canada, British Columbia, Alberta, Saskatchewan and Manitoba. All provinces were represented by two teams in each of the three disciplines, men's, women's and doubles.

Format
The Best of the West U30 Championship was played in a round-robin tournament with two pools of four in each of the three disciplines, men's, women's and doubles. The top two teams in each pool at the conclusion of the three game round robin advanced to the semifinal round, with the winners then moving on to the championship game.

Men

Teams
The teams are listed as follows:

Round-robin standings
Final round-robin standings

Round-robin results

All draw times are listed in Mountain Time (UTC−06:00).

Draw 2
Friday, April 22, 12:30 pm

Draw 4
Friday, April 22, 8:30 pm

Draw 5
Saturday, April 23, 8:30 am

Tiebreaker
Saturday, April 23, 4:30 pm

Playoffs

Semifinals
Saturday, April 23, 8:30 pm

Final
Sunday, April 24, 4:30 pm

Women

Teams
The teams are listed as follows:

Round-robin standings
Final round-robin standings

Round-robin results

All draw times are listed in Mountain Time (UTC−06:00).

Draw 1
Friday, April 22, 8:30 am

Draw 3
Friday, April 22, 4:30 pm

Draw 6
Saturday, April 23, 12:30 pm

Playoffs

Semifinals
Saturday, April 23, 8:30 pm

Final
Sunday, April 24, 12:00 pm

Doubles

Teams
The teams are listed as follows:

Round-robin standings
Final round-robin standings

Round-robin results

All draw times are listed in Mountain Time (UTC−06:00).

Draw 1
Friday, April 22, 8:30 am

Draw 2
Friday, April 22, 12:30 pm

Draw 3
Friday, April 22, 4:30 pm

Draw 4
Friday, April 22, 8:30 pm

Draw 5
Saturday, April 23, 8:30 am

Draw 6
Saturday, April 23, 12:30 pm

Playoffs

Semifinals
Saturday, April 23, 8:30 pm

Final
Sunday, April 24, 9:00 am

References

External links

2022 in Canadian curling
2022 in Saskatchewan
Best of the West (curling)
Sports competitions in Saskatoon
Curling in Saskatoon